Rasm al-Abed is a Syrian town located in Dayr Hafir District, Aleppo.  According to the Syria Central Bureau of Statistics (CBS), Rasm al-Abed had a population of 2,416 in the 2004 census. Rasm al-Abed was captured by Syrian Arab Army on 15 March 2017 from ISIS.

References

Populated places in Dayr Hafir District
Villages in Aleppo Governorate